Tau Ceti e, also called 52 Ceti e, is an exoplanet orbiting Tau Ceti that was detected by statistical analyses of the data of the star's variations in radial velocity that were obtained using HIRES, AAPS and HARPS. Based upon the incident flux upon the planet, a study by Güdel et al. (2014) speculated that the planet may lie inside the inner-boundary of the habitable zone and closer to a Venus-like world.

References 

Tau Ceti
Exoplanets discovered in 2012
Exoplanets in the habitable zone